Kapila Vatsyayan (25 December 1928 – 16 September 2020) was a leading scholar of Indian classical dance, art, architecture, and art history. She served as a member of parliament and bureaucrat in India, and also served as the founding director of the Indira Gandhi National Centre for the Arts.

In 1970, Vatsyayan received the Sangeet Natak Akademi Fellowship, the highest honour conferred by the Sangeet Natak Akademi, India's national academy for music, dance and drama; this was followed by the Lalit Kala Akademi Fellowship, the highest honour in the fine arts conferred by Lalit Kala Akademi, India's national academy for fine arts in 1995. In 2011, the Government of India bestowed upon her the Padma Vibhushan, India's second highest civilian honour.

Early life and background
She was born in Delhi to Ram Lal and Satyawati Malik. She earned an MA in English literature from Delhi University. Thereafter, she completed a second MA in Education at the University of Michigan, Ann Arbor, and a PhD at the Banaras Hindu University.

The poet and art critic Keshav Malik was her older brother, and she was married to the noted Hindi Writer S.H. Vatsyayan 'Ajneya' (1911–1987). They married in 1956 and separated in 1969.

Death 
Kapila Vatsyayan died on 16 September 2020, aged 92, at her home in New Delhi.

Career
Vatsyayan authored many books, including The Square and the Circle of Indian Arts (1997), Bharata: The Natya Sastra (1996), and Matralaksanam (1988).

In 1987, she became the founder trustee and member secretary of the Indira Gandhi National Centre for the Arts (Indira Kalakendra), India's premier arts organisation, in Delhi. Thereafter, in 1993, she was made its academic director, a post she held until 2000, when she was retired by a BJP-led centre-right government. In 2005, when an Indian National Congress-led centre-left government returned to power, she was made the chairperson of the institution. She also served as Secretary to the Government of India in the Ministry of Education, where she was responsible for the establishment of a large number of national institutions of higher education. She was the chairperson of the Asia Project at the India International Centre, New Delhi.

She is known for her collaboration with great artists, such as legendary Koodiyattam maestro Guru Mani Madhava Chakyar (1899-1990) and played pivotal role in safeguarding the legacy of classical Indian art forms.

She was nominated as a member of the Upper House of Parliament of India, the Rajya Sabha in 2006, though subsequently in March 2006, she resigned following an office of profit controversy. In April 2007, she was renominated to the Rajya Sabha, with a term expiring in February 2012.

Awards
Vatsyayan received the Sangeet Natak Akademi Fellowship in 1970. In the same year she was awarded a fellowship from the John D. Rockefeller 3rd Fund to survey cultural institutions and contemporary art developments in the United States and Indonesia. She was awarded the prestigious Jawaharlal Nehru Fellowship in 1975. In 1992 the Asian Cultural Council honoured her with the John D. Rockefeller 3rd Award for outstanding professional achievement and her significant contribution to the international understanding, practice, and study of dance and art history in India. In 1998, she received the "Outstanding Contribution to Dance Research" award, given by Congress on Research in Dance (CORD). In 2000, she was a recipient of Rajiv Gandhi National Sadbhavana Award and in 2011, she was awarded the Padma Vibhushan by the Government of India.

Bibliography

References

External links
Interview on formative influences
Interview on Australian radio

1928 births
2020 deaths
Indian women science writers
Indian social sciences writers
Women artists from Delhi
Delhi University alumni
University of Michigan School of Education alumni
Banaras Hindu University alumni
Indian women academics
Indian art historians
Indian arts administrators
Dance writers
Dance research
20th-century Indian women politicians
20th-century Indian politicians
Fellows of the Lalit Kala Akademi
Foreign Members of the Russian Academy of Sciences
Nominated members of the Rajya Sabha
Recipients of the Padma Vibhushan in arts
Recipients of the Sangeet Natak Akademi Fellowship
Jawaharlal Nehru Fellows
Indian women historians
20th-century Indian historians
20th-century Indian women writers
20th-century Indian women scientists
20th-century Indian scientists
Recipients of the Padma Shri in arts
Women writers from Delhi
20th-century Indian women artists
Indian women scholars
20th-century Indian non-fiction writers
21st-century Indian non-fiction writers
Scholars from Delhi
Women educators from Delhi
Educators from Delhi
Women members of the Rajya Sabha